The Star of Santa Clara is a 1958 West German musical comedy film directed by Werner Jacobs and starring Vico Torriani, Gerlinde Locker and Ruth Stephan. It was shot at the Spandau Studios in Berlin. The film's sets were designed by the art director Paul Markwitz.

Cast
 Vico Torriani as Carlo del Ponte
 Gerlinde Locker as Antonella
 Ruth Stephan as Mitzi Underhuber
 Hubert von Meyerinck as Manager Freddy
 Brigitte Mira as Tante Theresa
 Hugo Lindinger as Bürgermeister
 Willibald Alexis as Ottone
 Harry Tagore as Mario
 Manfred Schäffer as Pancratio
 Wolfgang Neuss as Gastwirt Matteo Tartini
 Wolfgang Müller as sein Bruder Tino Tartini

References

Bibliography
 Lutz Peter Koepnick. The Cosmopolitan Screen: German Cinema and the Global Imaginary, 1945 to the Present. University of Michigan Press, 2007.

External links

1958 films
1958 musical comedy films
German musical comedy films
West German films
1950s German-language films
Films directed by Werner Jacobs
Films about singers
Films set in Italy
Films shot at Spandau Studios
1950s German films